Bridget Otoo (born 31 December 1983) is a Ghanaian freelance journalist, media personality and public relations officer. She previously served in various capacities with TV3 Network Limited as a broadcaster and news anchor. She is also an advocate for women empowerment as well as LGBTQI+ community in Ghana.

Education 
Otoo undertook primary education in Aggrey Memorial Basic School, Sekondi before heading to Bompeh Senior High Technical School, Takoradi, for her secondary school education, where she was the Girls Prefect. She was hooked with a nickname “The “Headmistress “ this name was given to her because of the blunt, confident and upfront attributes.

She attained a Bachelor of Arts (BA) Degree in Mass Communication Studies from the Ghana Institute of Journalism (GIJ). She also holds a Master of Business Administration (MBA) Degree from the University of Ghana, Legon.

Career 
Otoo worked with Ghana Ports and Harbours Authority (GPHA) performing public relation duties during her National Service period. She has worked in the media circles on both radio and TV with Good News FM and Sky TV in 2008. Prior to that in 2003, she was a voice over artist recording advertisements for some institutions (Tigo, Barclays, Unilever and Ecobank). She hosted "New Day", "You and the Police" and prime time news on TV3 for a period.

Personal life 
Bridget, daughter of Francis Otoo and Agnes Arthur, has six (6) siblings. In 2021, She declared her stand regarding LGBTQ brought in a lot of controversies She asserted in a Twitter post saying she was willing and selflessly going to support the LGBTQI agenda in Ghana notwithstanding what religious folks say about them. She also declared that if supporting LGBTQI is the fastest and easiest way to hell, she is ready for support because she wants to meet satan.

References 

Living people
Ghanaian journalists
Ghanaian women journalists
University of Ghana alumni
Ghana Institute of Journalism alumni
1983 births